Dr Archibald McKendrick LDS FRSE DPH (1876–1960) was a Scottish dentist and radiologist. He was one of the first people in Britain to use X-rays in dentistry.

Life
He was born in Kirkcaldy in Fife on 1 June 1876, the son of James D. McKendrick, dental surgeon. He followed in his father's footsteps and qualified as a Dentist in Edinburgh in 1899. In 1907 he was elected a Fellow of the Royal College of Surgeons of Edinburgh.

From 1909 he was working as Surgeon/Dental Surgeon in charge of Radiology under Dawson Turner with William Hope Fowler at the Edinburgh Royal Infirmary. He was then living at 27 Chalmers Street next to the Infirmary.
In 1914 he was elected a Fellow of the Royal Society of Edinburgh. His proposers were Arthur Robinson, Henry Harvey Littlejohn, David Berry Hart, and Thomas William Drinkwater.

He died in Edinburgh on 2 November 1960 aged 84.

Family
In 1909 he married Gertrude Maud Smith.

References

1876 births
1960 deaths
People from Kirkcaldy
British radiologists
Scottish dentists
Fellows of the Royal Society of Edinburgh